Dig Your Own Grave was a CD/DVD EP released on 23 April 2006 by Test Icicles. It contained a CD of remixes and other previously unreleased material, which was accompanied by a DVD of music videos and live footage from a gig at the LSE in London, in November 2005. The EP was first sold on the band's final 5 show tour. "Dig Your Own Grave" then became available in record stores a week later.

Track listing

Disc 1 (CD) 
 Pull the Lever (Raaary's Ripmix)
 Your Biggest Mistake (Unreleased Single Edit)
 All You Need Is Blood (Dev's! Mix)
 Stuck In The Bend (Unreleased Track)
 The Plague + Pestilence (Raary Deci-Hells' Demo March '06)
 Circle Square Triangle (Chrome Hoof Remix)
 Pull The Lever (Jitset Remix)
 What's Michelle Like? [Bonus Track] (4-Track Demo, July '04)
 Who Ate All The Offal? [Bonus Track] (4-Track Demo, July '04)

Disc 2 (DVD) 
 Circle Square Triangle (Music Video)
 What's Your Damage? (Music Video)
 Your Biggest Mistake (Live at the LSE, Nov '05)
 Circle Square Triangle (Live at the LSE, Nov '05)
 Dancing on Pegs (Live at the LSE, Nov '05)
 Boa vs Python (Live at the LSE, Nov '05)
 Catch It! (Live at the LSE, Nov '05)

2006 EPs
Test Icicles albums
Domino Recording Company EPs
2006 video albums
Domino Recording Company video albums